Eltingville may refer to:
 Eltingville, Staten Island, New York
 Eltingville (Staten Island Railway station)
 Eltingville Transit Center, Staten Island
 Eltingville (comics) by Evan Dorkin
 Welcome to Eltingville animated pilot by Dorkin based on the comic